G17 Plus was a centre-right political party in Serbia. Founded as a non-governmental organization dealing with economic issues, in 2002 it transformed into a political party that became part of several ruling coalition governments in Serbia throughout the 2000s and early 2010s. In 2013, it merged into United Regions of Serbia.

Foundation
G17 Plus was founded in 1997 as a non-governmental organization (NGO) in Serbia, then a federal unit within FR Yugoslavia. The organization consisting of economic experts enjoyed financial support of the United States through the National Endowment for Democracy (NED).

The organization was registered as a political party on 15 December 2002, with Miroljub Labus as its first president.

At its first electoral showing at the 2003 parliamentary elections, G17 Plus received 11.5% of the popular vote and 34 seats in the National Assembly.

In March 2004, G17+ formed a coalition government with the Democratic Party of Serbia (DSS), the Serbian Renewal Movement (SPO) and New Serbia (NS). In May 2006 Miroljub Labus resigned as party leader and was replaced by Mlađan Dinkić. On October 1, 2006, the party quit the governing coalition over its failure to find and extradite ICTY fugitive Ratko Mladić.

In the 2007 elections, the party received 6.82% of the popular vote and 19 seats in the parliament.

G17+ received a single seat in the Community Assembly of Kosovo and Metohija.

In 2010, G17 Plus founded the United Regions of Serbia (URS), a coalition of political parties and groups emphasizing decentralization and regional development of Serbia. After a few years functioning as the centerpiece of the coalition, in April 2013 G17 Plus fully merged with URS, transforming it into a political party.

Presidents of the G17 Plus (2002–2013)

Electoral results

Presidential elections

Positions held
Major positions held by G17 Plus members:

References

External links
Official website

2002 establishments in Serbia
2013 disestablishments in Serbia
Conservative parties in Serbia
Defunct political parties in Serbia
International Democrat Union member parties
Liberal conservative parties
Political parties disestablished in 2013
Political parties established in 2002
Pro-European political parties in Serbia
Democratic Party (Serbia) breakaway groups